The Dementia with Lewy Bodies Consortium (DLB Consortium or DLBC) is an international multidisciplinary collaboration of researchers interested in the dementia with Lewy bodies. It first convened in Newcastle upon Tyne, England, in October 1995.  Between 1995 and 2005, it issued three DLBC Consensus Reports on dementia with Lewy bodies.

Fourth Consensus Report 

The 2017 rewrite of the diagnostic criteria for DLB was led by Ian G. McKeith of Newcastle University and supported by The National Institute on Aging, National Institutes of Neurological Disorders and Stroke, the Lewy Body Dementia Association, the Lewy Body Society, Alzheimer’s Association, Acadia Pharmaceuticals, Axovant Sciences, Banner Health, GE Healthcare, and Lundbeck.

DLBC 2015 
The 2015 DLBC in the United States is a project of the Parkinson's Disease BioMarker Program of the National Institute of Neurological Disorders and Stroke that "establishes a group of centers dedicated to the study of dementia with Lewy bodies (DLB) ... to allow for the discovery of a biomarker for DLB to improve the diagnosis, care, and treatment of patients with this disease".

As of 2020, it includes nine centers that have Lewy body dementia experts who have "strong connections to the Lewy body dementia research and general community".  The DLBC will "formalize and strengthen already existing collaboration among the participating centers".  The nine centers as of 2018 are:

 Cleveland Clinic
 Florida Atlantic University
 Thomas Jefferson University
 Rush University
 University of California San Diego
 University of North Carolina
 University of Pennsylvania
 University of Pittsburgh
 VA Puget Sound Health Care System - University of Washington

The DLBC is funded by a "$6 million, five-year grant from the National Institutes of Health"; it was also funded by the Lewy Body Dementia Association and GE Healthcare.

Sources

References

External links
Official website of US DLBC
 

National Institutes of Health
Lewy body dementia
Neuroscience projects